Queen Victoria Spring Nature Reserve is a protected area managed by the Department of Parks and Wildlife and is located approximately  east of Kalgoorlie in the Great Victoria Desert in the Goldfields-Esperance region of Western Australia.

The explorer Ernest Giles named the spring in September 1875 as a part of the first successful east–west crossing from South Australia to the coast of Western Australia. At the time the spring was full of water, which was a great relief to him after spending 17 days without water. In 1891, the Elder Scientific Exploring Expedition, arrived at the spring hoping to fing water but instead found it dry.

The western portion of the reserve lies in the Western Australian mulga shrublands ecoregion (Murchison bioregion), and the eastern portion is in the Great Victoria Desert.

The north eastern part of the reserve is composed of sand plains and sand dunes with occasional salt pans with red-brown soils. The south west is composed of more complex soils with gently undulating plains with some outcrops of rocks, the soils are alkaline red earth underlain by limestone or with limestone nodules found just under the soil layer.

Two rare vertebrates; Southern Marsupial Mole (Notoryctes typhlops) and Mulgara (Dasycercus cristicauda) have both been collected from around the spring. Rare flora including species of Eremophila are also found within the park.

References

Nature reserves in Western Australia
Goldfields-Esperance
Western Australian mulga shrublands
Great Victoria Desert